George Kenneth Griffey (born April 10, 1950) is an American former professional baseball player and coach. He also played for the New York Yankees, Atlanta Braves and the Seattle Mariners.

A three-time All-Star, Griffey hit over .300 five times in his role as the table-setter for the powerful Cincinnati batting order that was known as the Big Red Machine for their dominance of the National League in the mid-1970s. In 2004, Griffey was inducted into the Cincinnati Reds Hall of Fame. He is the father of Hall of Fame outfielder Ken Griffey Jr.

Early life
Griffey was raised by a single mother of six; his father Buddy—a high school teammate of another Hall of Fame outfielder, Stan Musial—left the family when Griffey was two years old. In a 2016 interview with ESPN, he said he did not see his father again until he was 16. His contemporaries in his hometown of Donora, Pennsylvania, did not think he would become a baseball star; they considered his best sport to be football, where he was a star wide receiver. Griffey himself considered football to be his best sport, followed by basketball, track, and only then baseball. At times, he would even compete in track meets during baseball games, rushing up the hill between Donora High School's baseball field and track between at-bats when it came time for his track events. 

However, as his high school graduation in 1969 neared, he discovered his girlfriend was pregnant. He would soon be chosen by the Reds in the 1969 draft, signed with the organization, and married his girlfriend. After his first minor-league season, Ken Jr. was born. Though Griffey left Donora in 1972 as his professional career advanced, he retains close ties to the town, making frequent visits to this day.

MLB career

Griffey made his MLB debut on August 25, 1973, with the Cincinnati Reds. That season, Griffey played in only 25 games, but batted .384 with three homers. The following season, Griffey saw more playing time with 88 games. In 1975, Griffey began to break out with a .305 batting average with four home runs and 46 RBIs. Griffey's best season came in 1976, when he came just short of winning the batting title behind Bill Madlock of the Chicago Cubs. 

Griffey chose to sit out the final day of the season to protect his batting title and it came back to haunt him as Madlock collected four hits that same day. Griffey entered the game late after hearing the news, and went 0-for-2. Many baseball purists were disappointed in Griffey (and perhaps more so in his manager, Sparky Anderson, for choosing to sit him out to gain an individual accolade). Griffey finished with a career high .336. He also finished eighth in the Most Valuable Player voting, and was named to the Sporting News National League All-Star team. The Reds would win their second consecutive World Series title in 1976, but that year also marked the beginning of the end of their "Big Red Machine" phase. In the next four seasons, Griffey batted .318, .288, .316, and .294 with a total of 43 home runs. In Griffey's final season of his first stint with the Reds, the strike-shortened 1981 campaign, he batted .311 with only two home runs and 34 RBIs.

After the 1981 season, Griffey (along with most of the remaining members of The Big Red Machine) was shipped out. Griffey was sent to the New York Yankees, where he played from 1982 to 1986 as a utility player at first base and outfield. Injuries plagued Griffey, who hit .306 with 11 homers and 46 RBIs in his best season with the Yankees. Tommy John thought Griffey was a better player on Astroturf fields (like Riverfront Stadium) than natural grass fields (like Yankee Stadium). In 1986, Griffey was shipped out mid-season to the Atlanta Braves, where he played for only one full season. Griffey was traded back to Cincinnati in the middle of the 1988 season. He only spent the 1989 season with the Reds, and was then released in the middle of the Reds' championship 1990 season, signing with the Seattle Mariners to conclude the season, joining his son Ken Jr. By becoming teammates with his son, they became the first father and son to be teammates in Major League Baseball. Griffey didn't play in the 1990 World Series, but he got a ring anyway. He spent only one more season with the Mariners, in 1991, before retiring after 19 seasons. In 1,997 games, Griffey compiled a lifetime batting average of .296, with 152 home runs and 859 RBI. Griffey was also the Most Valuable Player of the 1980 All-Star Game. In 2014, Griffey published his memoir Big Red: Baseball, Fatherhood, and My Life in the Big Red Machine, in which he discussed his childhood, formative years, professional career with both the Reds and the Yankees, and his relationships with friends and family.

The Griffeys
Joseph "Buddy" Griffey was a local athlete who was a teammate of Stan Musial on the Donora High School baseball team. He was the father of Ken Griffey Sr. and the grandfather of Ken Griffey Jr. The Griffeys (Ken Sr. and Ken Jr.) became one of the first father-and-son tandems to play on the same Major League Baseball team. They played their first game together for the Seattle Mariners on August 31, 1990. On September 14, 1990, father and son hit back-to-back home runs in a game against the California Angels; this is the only time in major league history that this has happened. Griffey's younger son Craig played in the Mariners minor league system and appeared with his brother in the outfield during some Cactus League games. Craig Griffey retired from baseball after failing to make it past Triple-A, where he appeared in a handful of games with the Tacoma Rainiers.

Griffey was inducted into the Cincinnati Reds Hall of Fame in 2004, and now resides in Winter Garden, Florida. In 2010, Griffey was hired as the batting coach for the Dayton Dragons, the Reds' Single A minor league affiliate. In 2011, Griffey was named Manager of the Bakersfield Blaze, the Reds Single A affiliate of the California League. In 2014, Griffey was replaced by Pat Kelly. Griffey will remain in the organization as a roving instructor, focusing on hitting and bunting. His grandson Trey Griffey went undrafted in the 2017 NFL draft, and spent time with the Indianapolis Colts, Miami Dolphins and the Pittsburgh Steelers.

Personal life
Griffey is married to Valarie Griffey. He is the father of Hall of Fame outfielder Ken Griffey Jr. and former minor league player Craig Griffey. The family lived in Beckett Ridge, Ohio. He is also the grandfather of Trey Griffey, a former wide receiver in the NFL. He and his elder son Ken Jr. share the same birth town as Baseball Hall of Famer Stan Musial. Ken Jr. also shares the same birthday as Musial, November 21.

See also

List of second-generation Major League Baseball players
 List of Major League Baseball career hits leaders
 List of Major League Baseball career runs scored leaders
 List of Major League Baseball career stolen bases leaders

References

External links

Ken Griffey Sr. at SABR (Baseball BioProject)

1950 births
Living people
African-American baseball coaches
African-American baseball players
American expatriate baseball players in Canada
Atlanta Braves players
Baseball coaches from Pennsylvania
Baseball players from Pennsylvania
Cincinnati Reds coaches
Cincinnati Reds players
Colorado Rockies (baseball) coaches
Gulf Coast Reds players
Indianapolis Indians players
Major League Baseball All-Star Game MVPs
Major League Baseball left fielders
Major League Baseball right fielders
National League All-Stars
New York Yankees players
People from Donora, Pennsylvania
People from West Chester, Butler County, Ohio
People from Winter Garden, Florida
Seattle Mariners coaches
Seattle Mariners players
Sioux Falls Packers players
Sportspeople from Pennsylvania
Tampa Tarpons (1957–1987) players
Trois-Rivières Aigles players
United States national baseball team people
21st-century African-American people
20th-century African-American sportspeople